The 960th Cyberspace Operations Group, at Lackland Air Force Base, Texas, is a United States Air Force group managing four squadrons relating to computer network operations.  The group was established 1 March 2013 as a reserve unit of the United States Air Force. On 1 March 2014, the 426th Network Warfare Squadron was again reactivated under the 960th Group. as its oldest part.

The group is responsible for operating and maintaining the Air Force's global enterprise network.  The 960th is the largest group compared to related reserve Wings. The group is composed of four network squadrons and multiple combat squadrons located around the nation.

Mission
The 960th Group provides command and control of the network security boundaries of all Air Force installations.  Technicians from the group are moving base-by-base and rolling all AF network core services (email, web access, etc.) into a single Air Force Network (AFNet). The AFNet is managed by two Network Operations Squadrons and their associated AFR components.

Assigned Units
 42d Cyberspace Operations Squadron, (Scott Air Force Base, Illinois)
associated with the 835th Cyberspace Operations Squadron
 426th Network Warfare Squadron, (Lackland Air Force Base, Texas) associated with the 33d Network Warfare Squadron
 50th Network Warfare Squadron, (Lackland Air Force Base, Texas)
 52d Network Warfare Squadron, (Offutt Air Force Base, Nebraska)
 689th Network Operations Squadron, (Maxwell-Gunter Air Force Base, Alabama) associated with the 26th Network Operations Squadron
 854th Combat Operations Squadron, (Lackland Air Force Base, Texas) associated with the 616th Operations Center
 960th Operations Support Flight (Lackland Air Force Base, Texas)

Assignments
 Tenth Air Force, 1 Mar 2013 – present

See also
 List of cyber warfare forces

References 

 Notes

External links 
 
 
 

Groups of the United States Air Force
Military units and formations of the United States Air Force Reserves